O'Neal Pullen (September 8, 1892 – April 19, 1944) was an American Negro league catcher for the Brooklyn Royal Giants and Baltimore Black Sox in the early 1920s.

A native of Beaumont, Texas, Pullen served in the US Army in France during World War I. He began his Negro leagues career in 1920 with the Brooklyn Royal Giants, and later played for the Baltimore Black Sox. Pullen spent the majority of his professional baseball career in the integrated California Winter League, and also was one of the first American baseball professionals to tour Japan.

Pullen died in Los Angeles, California in 1944 at age 51.

References

External links
 and Baseball-Reference Black Baseball stats and Seamheads

1892 births
1944 deaths
Baltimore Black Sox players
Brooklyn Royal Giants players
20th-century African-American sportspeople
Baseball catchers
United States Army personnel of World War I
African Americans in World War I
African-American United States Army personnel